Taner Edis (born August 20, 1967) is a Turkish American physicist and skeptic.  He is a professor of physics at Truman State University. He received his B.S. from Boğaziçi University in Turkey and his M.A. and Ph.D. from Johns Hopkins University. Edis is the author of several books on creationism, religion and science. He is a Scientific and Technical Consultant for the Committee for Skeptical Inquiry.

Early life

Born and raised in Istanbul, Turkey to secular Turkish and American parents, Edis traveled to the United States many times in his childhood.

Edis has lived in the United States since starting his master's degree at Johns Hopkins University. He earned his Ph.D. in 1994. He first encountered creationism during his studies in America – he thought it an "American oddity".

Career

Edis is professor of physics at Truman State University.

Skepticism

Edis's research "focuses on paranormal and supernatural claims and explores what their failures say about the nature of science". He is particularly interested in islamic creationism and the American intelligent design movement. Edis has been called "a liberal atheist, secular humanist and a zealous proselyte of scientific reason".

Fascinated by the plethora of supernatural and fringe science beliefs around him, and concerned about the rise of Islamist politics back in Turkey, Edis first got involved with skeptical inquiry into religious and paranormal claims during his graduate studies. "Science is difficult," states Edis to Point of Inquiry interviewer D.J. Grothe in answer to a question about why science has not replaced religion. Edis explains to his students that they will have difficulty understanding this "because the human brain is not wired to understand something like quantum mechanics and neutrinos correctly, it's a struggle." In an interview with Susan Gerbic at CSICon, Edis characterized his more recent writings on the subjects of science and skepticism by saying that "it might [even] be rational to believe in certain falsehoods. The argument turns on the costs of acquiring and possessing beliefs; sometimes truth is just too costly."

Edis has given several lectures about Islamic creationism. One of his premises is that creationism in the United States is quite moderate compared to Islamic countries. Turkey for example, despite being known as a secular state, has high levels of belief in a young Earth. This is because the textbooks and curriculum in the schools do not offer both evolution and creationism, but only creationism. Teaching evolution is not part of the syllabus at all. Grothe asked Taner in 2007 if he thought that Islam could be compatible with western science. His answer was that it just depends on the type of Islam. As in Christianity there are both liberal and conservative Muslims. The more liberal their views the more compatible they are with science.

Concerning crop circles Edis wrote that we know how these are created, we know the techniques. "So we do not need to find the perpetrator of every crop circle to figure out that probably they all are human made. Many true believers remain who continue to think there is something paranormal — perhaps alien — about crop circles. But the circles we know all fall within the range of the sort of thing done in hoaxes. Nothing stands out as extraordinary."

Reception

Edis was an editor of the book Why Intelligent Design Fails, which has received positive reviews. His book The Ghost in the Universe received the Morris D. Forkosch Book Award for "Best Humanist Book of 2002"

Reviewing Edis's 2016 book, Islam evolving: radicalism, reformation, and the uneasy relationship with the secular West, J.P. Dunn writes that Edis gives a wide-ranging exposition of how the Qur'an has been variously interpreted to provide an alternative to Western beliefs, and that this will "challenge, offend, and enlighten" the book's readers.

Within the context of Islam and science, Algerian astrophysicist Nidhal Guessoum categorizes Edis as a kind of "anti-harmonizer", who rejects the possibility that the two systems are reconciled. Guessoum writes that while Edis acknowledges that modern thinkers within Islam do not fully embrace anti-scientific religious dogmas, Edis is also "unhappy" that the materialist nature of science is not fully embraced.

Philosopher John Gray reviewed Edis's 2006 book, An Illusion of Harmony: Science and religion in Islam for The New Scientist. Gray writes that Edis's thesis is that there is a fundamental incompatibility between Islam and science because of the religion's dogmatic precepts. Gray calls Edis's work "one of the few recent books that truly illuminates the troubled relationship between science and religion".

Selected publications

References

External links
 
 Publications by Taner Edis at Academia.edu

1967 births
21st-century American physicists
American atheists
American skeptics
Critics of creationism
Boğaziçi University alumni
Johns Hopkins University alumni
Truman State University faculty
Lawrence Livermore National Laboratory staff
Living people
Turkish emigrants to the United States
Turkish atheists
Turkish physicists
Writers about religion and science